Mie Bjørndal Ottestad (born 17 July 1997) is a Norwegian professional racing cyclist, who currently rides for UCI Women's Continental Team . In August 2020, she won the Norwegian National Road Race Championships.

Major results
2015
3rd Road Race, National Junior Road Championships

2019
1st  Cyclo-cross, National Cyclo-cross Championships
2nd Stockholm Cyclo-cross

2020
1st  Road Race, National Road Championships
2nd Täby Cyclo-cross
3rd Stockholm Cyclo-cross

References

External links
 

1997 births
Living people
Norwegian female cyclists
Place of birth missing (living people)
Cyclo-cross cyclists
21st-century Norwegian women